Billericay Town Football Club is a football club based in Billericay, Essex, England. They are the second most successful club in FA Vase history, having won the competition on three occasions.

History
The club was established as Billericay Football Club in 1880. They joined the Romford & District League in 1890, where the club played until World War I. They also started playing in the Mid-Essex League, winning Division Two in 1912–13, 1931–32 and 1932–33. The club remained in the Mid-Essex League until joining the Southern Essex Combination League in 1947. In 1946 they adopted their current name. In 1966 the club were founder members of the Essex Olympian League. The 1969–70 season saw them win the league and League Cup double, a feat they repeated the following season. Following their back-to-back titles, the club became founder members of the Essex Senior League in 1971, finishing as runners-up in its first season and winning the title in 1972–73.

After finishing as runners-up again, Billericay won back-to-back league titles in 1974–75 and 1975–76. The latter season also saw them reach the final of the FA Vase and beat Stamford 1–0 at Wembley, as well as a first Essex Senior Cup title when they beat Epping Town 3–2 in the final. Although they only finished third in 1976–77, they retained the FA Vase, beating Sheffield 2–1 in a replay at the City Ground in Nottingham after a 1–1 draw at Wembley. In 1977 the club switched to the Athenian League, which they won at the first attempt. The 1978–79 season saw them retain their Athenian League title and win a third FA Vase in four seasons, beating Almondsbury Greenway 4–1 in the final, with Doug Young becoming the only player to score a hat-trick in an FA Vase final at the old Wembley. The following season saw them move up to Division Two of the Isthmian League, which they also won at the first attempt, earning promotion to Division One.

Billericay's success continued in 1980–81 as they finished as runners-up in Division One and were promoted to the Premier Division, the first time back-to-back promotions had been achieved in the league by a new club. The club remained in the Premier Division until being relegated to Division One at the end of the 1985–86 season. This began a spell as a yo-yo club, as they were relegated to Division Two North at the end of the 1988–89 season. The club were placed in Division Two in 1991 after league restructuring, before being promoted back to Division One in 1992–93 and then to the Premier Division in 1997–98 after finishing as Division One runners-up. The 1997–98 season also saw them reach the first round of the FA Cup for the first time, losing 3–2 at home to fellow non-League club Wisbech Town.

In 2004–05 Billericay reached the first round of the FA Cup again, losing 1–0 at home to Stevenage Borough. They also finished as Premier Division runners-up, qualifying for the promotion play-offs. However, the club were beaten 2–0 at home by Leyton in the semi-finals. A fourth-place finish in 2006–07 saw them qualify for the play-offs again, this time beating local rivals Chelmsford City 5–3 on penalties in the semi-finals after a 1–1 draw, before losing 4–2 on penalties to Bromley in the final following another 1–1 draw. In 2007–08 they qualified for the first round of the FA Cup again, losing 2–1 at home to Swansea City.

In 2010–11 Billericay won the Essex Senior Cup for a second time, beating Aveley 2–0 in the final. The following season saw the club win the Premier Division, earning promotion to the Conference South. However, they were relegated back to the Isthmian League the following season after finishing second-from-bottom of the Conference South. In December 2016 the club was taken over by Glenn Tamplin, who funded several high-profile signings including Jamie O'Hara, Jermaine Pennant and Paul Konchesky. They won the Isthmian League Cup in 2016–17, beating Tonbridge Angels 8–3 in the final. The club reached the first round of the FA Cup for a fourth time in 2017–18, drawing 1–1 at Leatherhead in the first match and losing the replay 3–1. The season also saw them retain the League Cup, beating Metropolitan Police 5–3 in the final, as well as winning the Premier Division title, earning promotion to the National League South. Tamplin announced that he was leaving the club in September 2019.

Another FA Cup first round appearance in 2018–19 saw Billericay lose 3–1 at home to Chesterfield in a replay. Billericay were relegated from the National League South following a 2–1 home defeat to Ebbsfleet United in the penultimate game of the 2021–22 season.

Ground

Archer Hall became the club's permanent home ground during the 1930s, although it remained an unenclosed pitch. In 1970 the club moved to New Lodge, which had previously been a sports ground used by Outwell Common Football Club. The ground was enclosed using a loan from Basildon Borough Council and Charrington Brewery and dressing rooms and a clubhouse were built. During the 1970s a covered standing area was built on the clubhouse side of the pitch, which became known as the Cowshed. Temporary seated stands loaned from Essex County Cricket Club were later installed on the other side of the pitch. In 1977 the club won a set of floodlights by winning the Philips Electrical Floodlight Competition final against Friar Lane Old Boys, a six-a-side tournament played at the Crystal Palace National Sports Centre the day after their FA Vase final against Sheffield. The floodlights were inaugurated with a friendly match against West Ham United, which attracted a then-record crowd of 3,841.

In 1980 a permanent 120-seat stand was built between the Cowshed and the clubhouse; its shape led to it becoming known as the Pacman stand. During the 1980s a 200-seat stand was built on the side that had previously hosted the temporary seating, with the supporters club erecting several small areas of terracing. In 1995 Billericay bought two stands that had been in use at Newbury Town's Faraday Road ground after the club went bust. One was installed next to the Cowshed and the other at the Blunts Wall End, with seats later installed in the Blunts Wall End stand. The new stand adjacent to the Cowshed was soon moved to the other end of the pitch. An area of covered terracing was added alongside the 200-seat stand. Chelmsford City groundshared at New Lodge between 1998 and 2005. In 2002 the club announced plans to move to a new 4,000-capacity stadium at Gloucester Park. However, the relocation was scrapped by new chairman Steve Kent in 2004. By the summer of 2017 the ground had a capacity of 3,500, of which 424 was seated and 2,000 was covered.

In the summer of 2017 New Lodge was completely redeveloped. Covered terraces were built at both ends of the ground covering the full width of the pitch; a new seated stand was built next to the clubhouse where the Pacman stand and Cowshed had previously been located, and was named the Harry Parker Stand. On the other side of the pitch the seating was extended to the full length of the pitch. The ground's capacity was raised to around 5,000 with 2,000 seated. A friendly match against West Ham on 8 August 2017 attracted a record crowd of 4,582.

Current squad

Coaching staff

Managers
Statistics are correct as of 11 May 2022.

All first team matches are counted.

Notes
A. : John Kendall was caretaker manager for ten matches before being appointed as manager.
B. : Dan Brown took charge for an Essex Senior Cup match on 7 December 2021.

Honours
Isthmian League
Premier Division champions 2011–12, 2017–18
Division Two champions 1979–80
League Cup winners 2016–17, 2017–18
FA Vase
Winners 1975–76, 1976–77, 1978–79
Athenian League
Champions 1977–78, 1978–79
League Cup winners 1977–78
Essex Senior League
Champions 1972–73, 1974–75, 1975–76
League Cup winners 1971–72, 1972–73, 1973–74, 1976–77
Essex Olympian League
Champions 1969–70, 1970–71
Senior Division Cup winners 1970–71
Challenge Cup winners 1970–71, 1971–72 (shared)
Mid-Essex League
Division Two champions 1912–13, 1931–32, 1932–33
Division Two League Cup winners 1930–31, 1932–33
Chelmsford & District League
Division Three champions 1932–33
Essex Senior Cup
Winners 1975–76, 2010–11, 2017–18, 2021–22
Essex Senior Trophy
Winners 1977–78, 1979–80
Essex Thameside Trophy
Winners 1986–87, 1991–92
JT Clark Memorial Trophy
Winners 1975, 1976, 1977, 1978, 1979
Phillips Electrical Floodlight Trophy
Winners 1976–77

Records
Best FA Cup performance: First round, 1997–98, 2004–05, 2007–08, 2017–18, 2018–19, 2019–20
Best FA Trophy performance: Quarter-finals, 2017–18
Best FA Vase performance: Winners, 1975–76, 1976–77, 1978–79
Biggest victory: 15–1 vs Cullis Athletic, Brentwood & District League, 9 December 1939
Heaviest defeat: 0–11:
 vs Southminster St. Leonards, Wickford & District League, 11 April 1908
 vs Great Waltham, Chelmsford & District League Division Two, 16 February 1929
Record attendance: 4,582 vs West Ham United XI, 8 August 2017
Lowest attendance: 54 vs Wembley, Isthmian League Division One, 5 December 1995
Most appearances: John Pullin, 418
Most goals: Fred Clayden, 273
Most goals in a season: Jake Robinson, 57 (2017–18)
Most goals in a match: 5:
Harry Welham in a 9–0 win vs Broomfield, Chelmsford & District League Division Two, 16 September 1911
Reg Whittaker in a 10–0 win vs Romford, Romford & District League Premier Division, 24 December 1949
Fred Clayden in a 7–1 win vs Dunmow, Essex Olympian League, 10 January 1970
Longest unbeaten run (all competitions): 28 matches, 13 October 1979 – 1 March 1980
Longest unbeaten league run: 39 matches, 21 April 1979 – 15 March 1980, Athenian League
Consecutive defeats: 6
22 March 2003 – 8 April 2003, Isthmian League Premier Division
6 April 2013 – 23 April 2013, Conference South
23 October 2021 – 20 November 2021, National League South
Record transfer fee received: £22,500+ from West Ham United for Steve Jones, 1992
Record transfer fee paid: £27,600 to Maidenhead United for Dean Inman, October 2017

See also
Billericay Town F.C. players
Billericay Town F.C. managers
Billericay Town F.C. Women

References

External links

Official website	
Billericay Town Ladies F.C.
Billericay Town Colts F.C.
Billericay Town History

 
Football clubs in England
Football clubs in Essex
Association football clubs established in 1880
1880 establishments in England
Billericay
Mid-Essex Football League
Essex Olympian Football League
Essex Senior Football League
Athenian League
Isthmian League
National League (English football) clubs